Kalatala Union is a Union parishad of Chitalmari Upazila, Bagerhat District in Khulna Division of Bangladesh. It has an area of 28.49 km2 (11.00 sq mi) and a population of 30,142.

References

Unions of Chitalmari Upazila
Unions of Bagerhat District
Unions of Khulna Division